The Samsung Galaxy Xcover 6 Pro is an Android-based smartphone designed, marketed, and manufactured by Samsung Electronics. It was announced on June 29, 2022.

References

External links 
 

Android (operating system) devices
Samsung Galaxy
Mobile phones introduced in 2022
Samsung smartphones
Samsung mobile phones
Mobile phones with multiple rear cameras
 Mobile phones with 4K video recording